Mike Henderson (born 1958/1959) is an American politician. He is a member of the Missouri House of Representatives from the 117th District, serving since 2017. He is a member of the Republican party.

Electoral History

References

1950s births
21st-century American politicians
Living people
Republican Party members of the Missouri House of Representatives